Relations between South Korea and Latin America have been growing since the 1960s. In the past decade, South Korean companies such as LG Corporation and Samsung have established businesses in Latin America, which improved trade relations between the two regions. LG and Samsung also played a role in the spread of K-Pop to Latin America. K-Pop by LG was a yearly dancing competition sponsored by LG electronics in Colombia. K-Pop by LG took place from 2011 to 2013 during the months of October through December in Bogotá, Medellín, and Cali, three major cities in Colombia. Samsung was named the official sponsor for South Korean boy band Big Bang during their first worldwide concert tour in 2012, the Big Bang Alive Galaxy Tour. Big Bang performed in Lima, Peru, the only city in South America they visited as part of their Alive Galaxy tour, on November 14, 2012. In 2011, South Korea's Ministry of Foreign Affairs and other government agencies organized the first K-Pop World Festival in Changwon, South Korea. This festival consists of K-Pop fans performing for global auditions and a finale in South Korea. In 2018, 71 countries participated in the global auditions, 17 of these in Latin America.

Television appearances 
On August 31, 2011, the official Facebook page for El Gran Show, a Peruvian dance reality show, released a survey asking their viewers to suggest a genre of music for the contestants to perform to. Most voters agreed that the show should feature K-Pop dancing routines. However, the show producers ignored the public's request, which led to turmoil and backlash from the Peruvian K-Pop fan-base. On November 10, 2012, El Gran Show featured dance performances to popular K-Pop songs: “Ring Ding Dong” by SHINee, “Fantastic Baby" by BIGBANG, “Sorry, Sorry” by Super Junior, and “Gangnam Style” by Psy.

On November 1, 2012, U-Kiss appeared on Dos Sapos una Reina (Two toads one Queen), a Peruvian television show, to perform the title track for their 7th mini album "Stop Girl," and to witness a choreography competition to their songs. They were introduced to the Peruvian audience as an Asian sensation with over one million followers on Facebook at the time.

K-Pop continues to appear in other Latin American television shows and media. In 2014, K-Pop was featured in Bailando por un Sueño (Dancing for a Dream) in a segment of Showmatch in Argentina. The program was successful with the help of Alejandro Velazquez better known as DJ Mosquito and the creator of VEGA Radio. VEGA Radio is a Pop and K-Pop radio station in Argentina that reproduces music for 6 different stations and is available live, online, and on the app. Hundreds of K-Pop fans in Argentina showed their support to the appearance of K-Pop on national Argentinian television by organizing a flash mob. The flash mob took place on November 23, 2014 at the Planetario Galileo Galilei located in Buenos Aires, where the fans danced to their favorite K-Pop songs such as "Hurricane Venus" by BoA, "Mr. Mr." by Girl's Generation and 2PM's "Go Crazy."

Concerts 
In recent years, an increasing number of K-pop groups have performed in Latin America. In 2013, the boy group Super Junior performed in four South American countries ― Brazil, Argentina, Chile and Peru -- as part of its Super Show 5 tour. Additionally, that same year on November 7, it had a show at Mexico City Arena, which attracted over 17,000 fans. Super Junior performed on April 27, 2018, at Mexico City Arena, a stage where various famous Latin American artists such as Ozuna, J Balvin, and Marco Antonio Solís also performed in 2018. NU'EST held concerts in Mexico, Brazil, Chile and Peru in 2014. In 2017, BTS visited Brazil and Chile where it performed as part of the Live Trilogy Episode III, the Wings Tour. On March 11-12, 2017, BTS held concerts in Santiago, Chile, and in Sao Paulo, Brazil, on March 19-20. As rookies, Dreamcatcher visited 4 cities in Brazil as part of their 2017 Fly High world tour,  and later returned to Latin America in 2018, visiting Argentina, Chile, Peru, Colombia and Panama as part of their Welcome to the Dream World world tour.

Impacts 
On November 30, 2006, the first Korean Cultural Center in Latin America was established in Buenos Aires, Argentina. Two other cultural centers were founded in Mexico City (2012) and São Paulo (2013). The Korean Cultural Center, Mexico City in Mexico officially opened to the public on March 13, 2012. This center is in Polanco, Mexico City, as a base for the spread of Hallyu in the region. Mexico City is known for its K-pop fan base of over 3 million. The 32 KCCs all around the globe are a project sponsored by the Korean Culture and Information Service, a subsidiary of the Ministry of Culture, Sports and Tourism in South Korea. The main purpose of these centers is to promote Korean culture and strengthen bilateral relations between South Korea and other nations. Concerts featuring traditional and popular Korean music, art shows, film festivals and Korean cooking lessons are among the many events sponsored and organized by the KCCs in Latin America.

Over the past decade, a number of K-pop groups and idols have included Spanish phrases in their lyrics. Some examples include: SF9's "O Sole Mio," KARD's "Hola Hola," GFriend's "Me Gustas Tu," and Super Junior's "Mamacita," and "Lo Siento."

See also 

 K-pop
 Korean Cultural Center
 Korean Wave
 Latin pop
 List of K-pop concerts held outside Asia

References

K-pop
Latin American culture